Charles Coles (21 July 1879 – 20 August 1942) was an Australian rules footballer who played with the Geelong Football Club in the Victorian Football League (VFL). He was a skilled follower with a nice kick, however his career was ruined through a broken leg in 1904. He was killed in 1942 while acting as a doorkeeper at the Palais Royal Dance Hall in Geelong.

References

External links

 
 

1879 births
1942 deaths
Accidental deaths in Victoria (Australia)
Deaths by beating
Australian rules footballers from Victoria (Australia)
Australian Rules footballers: place kick exponents
Chilwell Football Club players
Geelong Football Club players